Wet Bum (retitled Surfacing in some international markets) is a 2014 Canadian drama film, directed by Lindsay MacKay. The film stars Julia Sarah Stone as Sam, a shy and self-conscious teenage girl struggling to assert herself with those around her, including her older swimming teammates who make fun of her because she has not yet fully developed into womanhood and the residents of a nursing home where she has a part-time job as a cleaner.

The film's cast also includes Leah Pinsent as Sam's mother Mary Ellen, Jamie Johnston as her older brother Nate, Craig Arnold as her swimming coach Lukas, and Kenneth Welsh as Ed, a crotchety resident of the nursing home.

The film premiered at the 2014 Toronto International Film Festival.

The film received two Vancouver Film Critics Circle awards at the Vancouver Film Critics Circle Awards 2015, for Best Actress in a Canadian Film (Stone) and Best First Film by a Canadian Director. The film's visual effects team (Ian Britton, Robert Crowther, Steve Elliott, Oleksiy Golovchenko, Matt Philip, Jiang Shuming, Jay Stanners, Rob Tasker, Perunika Yorgova and Lexi Young) received a Canadian Screen Award nomination for Best Visual Effects at the 3rd Canadian Screen Awards.

References

External links
 
 

2014 films
2010s coming-of-age drama films
2010s sports drama films
Canadian coming-of-age drama films
English-language Canadian films
Films shot in Toronto
Swimming films
Canadian sports drama films
2014 drama films
2010s English-language films
2010s Canadian films